The Adelaide Metropolitan Football League (AMFL) was an Australian rules football competition based mainly in the eastern and south-eastern suburbs of Adelaide, South Australia.  Originally known as the Sturt District Football Association (SDFA), the competition reformed after World War II, became the Adelaide Metropolitan Football League in 1963 and folded at the end of the 1967 season.

Member Clubs

Premierships

Sturt District Football Association

Adelaide Metropolitan Football League

Medallists

H. S. Dunks Medal 
 1946 - Gerke, Harders, Thomas and May (Tie)
 1947 - William Maxwell May (Camden Park)
 1948
 1949
 1950
 1951 - Colin Hender (Blackwood)
 1952 - George Southby (Blackwood)
 1953 - George Southby (Blackwood)
 1954
 1955
 1956
 1957
 1958
 1959
 1960
 1961
 1962
 1963
 1964
 1965
 1966
 1967

References 

South Australian National Football League
1967 disestablishments in Australia
Defunct Australian rules football competitions in South Australia